Reinhard Schwarz-Schilling (9 May 1904 in Hannover – 9 December 1985 in Berlin) was a German composer.

The son of a chemical manufacturer, Schwarz-Schilling embarked upon his musical studies in 1922, first in Munich and – interrupted by several extended breaks in Italy – from 1925 in Cologne, where he studied with Walter Braunfels (composition), Philipp Jarnach (piano) and Heinrich Boell (organ). From 1927 to 1929, he studied with Heinrich Kaminski, who also taught Carl Orff. In 1938, he obtained a teaching position at the Musikhochschule in Berlin (now the Berlin University of the Arts). One of his most prominent pupils was Isang Yun.

A devout Catholic, Schwarz-Schilling's music was often inspired by religious and spiritual themes. His tonal language follows in the tradition of Johann Sebastian Bach and is strongly influenced by that of his teacher Heinrich Kaminski. His best known work is the Cantata Die Botschaft ("The Commission"), composed between 1979 and 1982, although he also composed a wide range of orchestral, chamber and choral works. His Symphony in C major(1963), Sinfonia diatonica (1957) and Introduction & Fugue for string orchestra (1948) have been recorded for CD.

His son is the German politician Christian Schwarz-Schilling.

References

1904 births
1985 deaths
20th-century German composers
Recipients of the Cross of the Order of Merit of the Federal Republic of Germany